Richard Cole (1671 – June 1729) was an Irish politician.

Cole sat in the Irish House of Commons as the Member of Parliament for St Canice from 1707 to 1713, before representing Enniskillen between 1713 and his death in 1729.

References

1671 births
1729 deaths
Cole family (Anglo-Irish aristocracy)
Irish MPs 1703–1713
Irish MPs 1713–1714
Irish MPs 1715–1727
Irish MPs 1727–1760
Members of the Parliament of Ireland (pre-1801) for County Fermanagh constituencies
Members of the Parliament of Ireland (pre-1801) for County Kilkenny constituencies